Survivor – A sziget (in English Survivor: The Island) is the Hungarian version of the Survivor game show, which was broadcast on RTL Klub. Its host was András Stohl. Two seasons were broadcast from September 2003 to December 2004. The prize for the sole survivors was 10,000,000 Ft and a Honda car. In 2017 RTL Klub decided to bring back the series with the new season premiering on 28 August 2017 with a new host, Bence Istenes.

Format and rules 

Survivor – A sziget followed the format of American Survivor, with some differences. In all seasons, sixteen contestants were separated into two tribes ('teams' in the Hungarian version) which consisted of four men and four women. When ten or nine players remained, the contestants merged into one team. Both tribes were represented by a particular animal. Unlike most other versions of Survivor, there wasn't always a jury, instead the public decide who was the winner between the two finalists. In the event of a tie, the contestants were forced to draw lots to determine who would be eliminated.

Survivor – A sziget seasons

External links
 Official site (archive) 

Hungary
Hungarian game shows
2003 Hungarian television series debuts
2004 Hungarian television series endings
2000s Hungarian television series
Hungarian reality television series
RTL (Hungarian TV channel) original programming